In botany, a follicle is a dry unilocular fruit formed from one carpel, containing two or more seeds. It is usually defined as dehiscing by a suture in order to release seeds, for example in Consolida (some of the larkspurs), peony and milkweed (Asclepias).

Some difficult cases exist however, so that the term indehiscent follicle is sometimes used, for example with the genus Filipendula, which has indehiscent fruits that could be considered intermediate between a (dehiscent) follicle and an (indehiscent) achene.

An aggregate fruit that consists of follicles may be called a follicetum. Examples include hellebore, aconite, Delphinium, Aquilegia or the family Crassulaceae, where several follicles occur in a whorl on a shortened receptacle, or Magnolia, which has many follicles arranged in a spiral on an elongated receptacle.

The follicles of some species dehisce by the ventral suture (as in Banksia), or by the dorsal suture (as in Magnolia).

References

External links

Fruit morphology